The National Monument of Scotland, on Calton Hill in Edinburgh, is Scotland's national memorial to the Scottish soldiers and sailors who died fighting in the Napoleonic Wars. It was intended, according to the inscription, to be "A Memorial of the Past and Incentive to the Future Heroism of the Men of Scotland".

The monument dominates the top of Calton Hill, just to the east of Princes Street. It was designed during 1823–6 by Charles Robert Cockerell and William Henry Playfair and is modelled upon the Parthenon in Athens. Construction started in 1826 and, due to the lack of funds, was left unfinished in 1829. This circumstance gave rise to various nicknames such as "Scotland's Folly", "Edinburgh's Disgrace", "the Pride and Poverty of Scotland" and "Edinburgh's Folly".

Proposals
As early as 1816, the Highland Society of Scotland called for the construction of a national monument to commemorate the fallen in the Napoleonic Wars. Initially The Mound was considered as a site, but was rejected in favour of Calton Hill.

In January 1822, a proposal was put forward to 'erect a facsimile of the Parthenon' at a cost of some £42,000. The appeal found support amongst many prominent Edinburgh residents such as Sir Walter Scott, Henry, Lord Cockburn and Francis, Lord Jeffrey.  The leading man behind the campaign to model the new monument specifically on the Athenian Parthenon was Thomas Bruce, 7th Earl of Elgin, who had controversially removed many of the temple's sculptures (now known as the Elgin Marbles) a decade earlier and brought them to Britain. In July 1822 the Royal Association of Contributors to the National Monument of Scotland was incorporated by an Act of Parliament. The foundation stone was laid, amid great pomp and ceremony, the following month.

Sixteen months after the initial appeal, only £16,000 had been found with the possibility of a £10,000 grant from Parliament. In 1826, the building was finally commissioned and work began. The builder contracted to execute the work was Messrs William Wallace & Son.

Originally, the building was planned to have extensive catacombs in the area supporting the main structure, to provide a burial place for significant figures, intended as a "Scottish Valhalla". A minute of the Royal Association in 1826 stated that the building was:

Laying of the foundation stone
The foundation stone, which weighs 6 tons, was laid on 27 August 1822, during the visit of George IV to Scotland.

The Duke of Hamilton (the most senior non-royal Scottish noble and the Grand Master of Scotland) led a procession of masonic lodges, royal commissioners and other dignitaries from Parliament Square to the top of Calton Hill. The procession was escorted by the Scots Greys and the 3rd Dragoons.

The deposition of the inscription plates in the stone was accompanied by cannon salutes from Edinburgh Castle, Salisbury Crags, Leith Fort and the royal squadron on Leith Roads.

Ideas for completion

Early proposals for completion work tended to focus on following the original plans; however, during the early 20th century several alternative plans were proposed:
 as a monument to Queen Victoria (1901)
 as a monument commemorating the 1707 Act of Union with England (1907)
 as a new Scottish National Gallery (1907)
 as a Scottish Parliament building (1908)
 as a memorial to those who fell in the Great War (1918, George Washington Browne)

Subsequent attempts to 'complete' the National Monument have never borne fruit for reasons of either cost or lack of local enthusiasm. A  proposal in 2004 met with a mixed reception.

The monument was repaired in December 2008, repositioning one of the stone lintels that had moved out of alignment. The cost was £100,262.

Protection
The National Monument was classified as a Category A Listed building in 1966. It is not a scheduled monument.

References

Further reading

External links
 Archiseek - National Monument
 Edinburgh Architecture - National Monument
 'A Building from which Derived "All that is Good". Observation on the Intended Reconstruction of the Parthenon on Calton Hill' by Marc Fehlmann in the online art magazine Nineteenth-Century Art Worldwide 

1829 establishments in Scotland
Buildings and structures completed in 1829
Calton Hill
Category A listed buildings in Edinburgh
Listed monuments and memorials in Scotland
Military of Scotland
Monuments and memorials in Edinburgh
Napoleonic Wars
Scotland
Scottish military memorials and cemeteries
Unfinished buildings and structures